All Souls, St Margarets, is a Church of England church on Northcote Road in St Margarets in the London Borough of Richmond upon Thames. Its vicar is Joe Sellers. Services are held on Sundays at 10am. Communion followed by lunch is held on the first Monday of the month at 12 noon. The style of worship is Open Evangelical.

References

External links
Official website

Church of England church buildings in the London Borough of Richmond upon Thames
Diocese of London